Bob Quinn Lake is an unincorporated community  in northwestern British Columbia, Canada. Both the locality and the lake are named after Robert Quinn, an area old timer and one-time lineman on the Yukon Telegraph Line.

References

Unincorporated settlements in British Columbia
Populated places in the Regional District of Kitimat–Stikine
Stikine Country